The Old Tel Aviv central bus station was the main bus station of Tel Aviv from 1941 until 1993. The station served intercity bus routes as well as local city and suburban buses. On August 18, 1993, Tel Aviv's New central bus station became the city's new transportation hub. The old station was demolished in July 2009.

History
When the station opened in 1941, it was intended to serve 60,000 passengers a day. It had six departure platforms linked by underground passages and another platform for arrivals. Soon after its opening, it was found to be inadequate and poorly planned. The canopies over the platforms were too narrow to protect passengers from rain and sun, and interfered with loading of baggage onto the roofs of the buses.

During the 1948 Arab–Israeli War the station was bombed by Egyptian planes, killing 42 persons, including four members of the Dan cooperative, and wounding 100.

On November 6, 1970, two bombs exploded in Tel Aviv at the central bus station killing one person and injuring 24.

On August 18, 1993, the main terminus for buses and taxis moved to the new Tel Aviv bus station and the old station was used mainly as a parking lot. On 31 July 2009, Egged rerouted all remaining bus lines passing through the station. On 2 August 2009 the last platforms  were demolished.

In the 2000s the area became a centre for prostitution.

In 2010s the area became populated by foreign workers. In 2015, a new housing development project began and is expected to signify a new era of gentrification for the area. This has resulted in many raids and closures of premises used for prostitution.

See also
 Transport in Tel Aviv

References

External links
The Place of the Mediterranean in Modern Israeli Identity, Alexandra Nocke

Bus stations in Israel
Buildings and structures in Tel Aviv
Transport in Tel Aviv
Former bus stations
Red-light districts in Israel
Demolished buildings and structures in Israel
Buildings and structures demolished in 2009